The 2018 installment of The Challenge: Champs vs. Stars, a recurring special mini-series of MTV's The Challenge, premiered on April 17, 2018. The season features ten alumni from The Challenge who made it to a final on the show or on Road Rules competing with ten celebrities.

Contestants

 The contestant is representing the Champs.
 The contestant is representing the Stars.

Draft
The winners of the first challenge were made team captains that would divide the Champs and Stars into two separate teams. Tony and CT were the captains.

In Episode 7, the remaining players were paired into teams of two. The leaders on the scoreboard got to choose their partners.

Game summary

Challenge games
 Stair Down: Challengers compete in two heats, half Champs and half Stars each heat. They are covered in lube and must make their way to the top of a flight of stairs. The winners of each heat become the team captains for drafting the mixed teams. Once drafted, the total combined time from each individual player determined which newly formed team with the fastest time was the winner.
 Winners: Blue Team - MVP: Tony
 Over the Edge: Similar to shuffleboard, players must sit on top of a giant puck while another teammate pushes them to score points. Touching the ground while on the puck of going over the edge of the board disqualifies that player.
 Winners: Red Team - MVP: Ashley
 Release the Rainbow: Competitors are connected to a piece of ribbon and must untangle themselves from a giant jungle gym. Players may assist other players on their teams as long as they don't lock their ribbon in its final position. The first team to have all their players untangle themselves and connected to their final puzzle wins.
 Winners: Red Team - MVP: CT
 Face Off: Played on a football field in heats, players take turns on offense and defense. On offense, a player must kick a small ball past the 10-yard line while their teammates try to protect them, by blocking defenders with giant blown up balls. Similarly, the players on defense must stop the offensive player from bringing the small ball back into the endzone by knocking them over with the blown up balls.
 Winners: Blue Team - MVP: Louise
 Jumbo Table Hockey: Contestants play a game of field hockey, however the area they can move around is limited to moving their hockey sticks which are connected to the table. 
 Winners: Blue Team - MVP: Daniel
 Crossfire: Players must divide their teams: half chosen to shoot dodgeballs using slingshots at giant stacks of boxes they must knock over, the other half hanging over the stack of boxes trying to defend them. When a player's stack of boxes is knocked over, they drop down to the ground and then may help retrieve balls for their teammates. The first team to have all the other team's boxes knocked over wins.
 Winners: Blue Team - MVP: Drake
 Go Deep: Partners must dive into an Olympic swimming pool and take turns moving a ring along a series of pipes. The first team to figure out the puzzle and remove the ring from the pipes and return it outside of the pool wins.
 Winners: Brooke & Shane - MVP: Shane
 Spot On: Similar to Twister, players must hold themselves between two walls with colored pegs. They must move their arms and legs to the corresponding colored peg that is called out. If players stop touching a peg, they are eliminated, and the last player remaining wins for their team, while the bottom 3 teams are on the chopping block.
 Winners: Casper & Louise - MVP: Casper
 Text Tile: Similar in style to the "Die Hard" Gulag from Cutthroat, teams must move a large crate across a beach, where one player lifts and moves the crate, while the other balances on top of the crate. Once at a certain mark, players must then open up their crate to find letters for a puzzle. The first players to solve the "Millennial Crossword Puzzle" wins and earn a spot in the final challenge.
 Winners: CT & Tony - MVP: Tony
 Bankroll: In the final challenge, the teams participate in four stations. After each station is complete, teams must collect a coin and deposit it to their "Miz Bank" before moving on to the next station.
 Puck It: Teams must use shuffle sticks to push a tire off an elevated ramp while standing on a balance beam. If a player falls off the balance beam, the team must start over.
 Blockhead: Teams must use a hoverboard to collect block puzzle pieces. Once all the pieces are collected, teams must then assemble a block wall puzzle with the faces of all the cast members.
 Eat and Run: Teams must use star poles to move five balls into a bucket. After each ball is deposited, they may then select a food item. Once all balls are deposited in the bucket, the teams may then eat their selected food items.
 Beat Box: Teams must unwrap, untie, and unchain several layers around a giant box to complete a slider puzzle inside.
Winners: CT & Tony (won $100,000)
Second Place: Casper & Louise (won $50,000)
Third Place: Daniel & Wes

Arena Games
Screw Off: Contestants must use a baseball bat to hit a flat piece of metal connected to a giant screw. The first contestant to successfully completely unscrew their piece wins.
Played by: Arian vs. Casper
Rock & Roll: Contestants start in the middle of a platform. Contestants must wrestle a large box with handles to their sides of the platform twice to defeat their opponent.
Played by: Brooke vs. Kam
Throwing Shade: Similar to cornhole, contestants must smash boxes and use the objects found inside to throw at picture targets of their opponent's face. The first contestant to hit all of the targets wins.
Played by: Shane vs. Tony
Popping Tags: Contestants are covered in large clothing tags and must wrestle their opponent to pull of three of their tags while defending their own tags.
Played by: Devin vs. Wes
Free Your Mind: This puzzle elimination has contestants placed within a cylinder bodysuit with pipes jutting out of it, and then placed within a cage with which the pipes they are connected to intersect. Contestants must figure out how to maneuver their bodies in order to escape from the cage. The first one to do so wins. 
Played by: Ashley vs. Kailah
Flip Cup: Similar to the drinking game, players must flip over 3 cups face down before their partner must do the same. They then must flip over a giant flip cup with their partner inside, before switching with their partner and flipping the giant cup back to the start position.  
Played by: Casper & Louise vs. Jozea & Selita
Icy Hot: Contestants must work with their partners and jump to touch buttons one thousand times total. They then must use an ice pick to break open a block of ice, untangle frozen jerseys inside, put on the jerseys, and then jump and touch the buttons another thousand times.
Played by: Casper & Louise vs. Drake & Kailah

Elimination chart

Episode progress

Competition
 The contestant won the final challenge.
 The contestant did not win the final challenge.
 The contestant won the challenge, was named "MVP" for their team, and was immune from the Arena.
 The contestant won the challenge with their team, but was not "MVP", and was immune from the Arena.
 The contestant won in the Arena.
 The contestant had immunity for the week.
 The contestant lost the challenge and was eligible for elimination by the MVP of that challenge, but was not chosen to be eliminated.
 The contestant lost in the Arena, but their team voted to save them.
 The contestant lost in the Arena and was eliminated.
 The contestant lost the challenge and was eliminated by the MVP of that challenge.
 The contestant was removed from the competition due to illness or injury. 
 The contestant withdrew from the competition.

Bank progress

Competition
 The contestant won the final challenge.
 The contestant did not win the final challenge.
 The contestant won the challenge, was named "MVP" for their team, and was immune from the Arena.
 The contestant won the challenge with their team, but was not "MVP", and was immune from the Arena.
 The contestant won in the Arena.
 The contestant had immunity for the week.
 The contestant didn't win the challenge and was eligible for elimination by the MVP of that challenge, but was not chosen to be eliminated.
 The contestant lost in the Arena, but their team voted to save them.
 The contestant lost in the Arena and was eliminated.
 The contestant didn't win the challenge and was eliminated by the MVP of that challenge.
 The contestant was removed from the competition due to illness or injury. 
 The contestant withdrew from the competition.

Power Play

Notes

Episodes

Reunion Special
The reunion special aired on June 26, 2018, and was hosted by WWE pro wrestler, The Real World: Back to New York alum, and Challenge champion Mike "The Miz" Mizanin. Most of the cast members attended at the MTV Studios in New York. Missing from the reunion were Hennessy Carolina and Arian Foster. Drake Bell made his appearance via video chat.

References

External links
 

The Challenge (TV series)
Television shows set in Los Angeles
2018 American television seasons
Celebrity reality television series